is a Japanese actor known for his work in commercials, cartoons, and video games. Since 2005, he has voiced the role of Toshi Yoshida on Fox's American Dad!.

Beyond American Dad!, Suzuki's other credits include Hibakusha, Tales From The Dead, Pound Puppies, and The Hillz.

Suzuki has provided additional voice work for video games such as Call of Duty: Advanced Warfare, Tomb Raider, and The Secret World.

In a 2011 interview with producer Steve Nguyen for Asiance Magazine, Suzuki said that once he completed his university studies in Japan, he made the decision to move to the United States in order to further his education. After graduating from the University of California, Santa Barbara with a bachelor's degree in Film Studies, Suzuki decided to pursue acting as a full-time career.

Filmography
 The Hillz (2004) - Asian Gangster 
 Hit Me (2005) - Tao
 American Dad! (2005–present) - Toshi
 Tales From The Dead (2008) - Sheriff Harada
 Happy Birthday To Me (short) (2011) - The Curator 
 Pound Puppies (2011) - Mr. Sasaki
 Hibakusha (2012) - Father
 Tomb Raider (2013) - Oni / General / Japanese Soldier
 Call of Duty: Advanced Warfare (2013) 
 The Secret World (2014) - Masao Tanaka
 Bless the Harts (2020) - Hiroki Kakatani

References

External links

1972 births
Japanese male voice actors
Japanese male video game actors
Living people
Voice actors from Hamamatsu
Place of birth missing (living people)
Male voice actors from Shizuoka Prefecture
Japanese emigrants to the United States